Quercus argyrotricha is a rare Chinese species of trees in the beech family. It has been found only in Guizhou Province in southern China.

It is placed in subgenus Cerris, section Cyclobalanopsis.

Quercus argyrotricha is a tree with yellow twigs and leaves as much as 12 cm long.

References

External links
line drawing, Flora of China Illustrations vol. 4, figure 388, drawing 4 at bottom

argyrotricha
Flora of Guizhou
Plants described in 1931
Taxa named by Aimée Antoinette Camus